Abdullah Ramadan Bakheet Soliman Bakheet (Arabic:عبد الله رمضان بخيت سليمان بخيت; born 11 September 1998) is an Emirati professional footballer who plays for Al Jazira.

Career
Abdullah Ramadan is an Egyptian player born in the United Arab Emirates. He played with Al Jazira in juniors and participated in the first team in 2018 after allowing the born in United Arab Emirates to participate in the UAE Pro League. He was granted Emirati citizenship in 2019 and was chosen to participate with the first team in 24th Arabian Gulf Cup and was chosen to participate with the Olympic team to participate in 2020 AFC U-23 Championship.

External links

References

1998 births
Emirati footballers
Egyptian footballers
United Arab Emirates international footballers
Olympic footballers of the United Arab Emirates
Naturalized citizens of the United Arab Emirates
Emirati people of Egyptian descent
Living people
Al Jazira Club players
UAE Pro League players
Association football midfielders
Place of birth missing (living people)